Haskovo Province ( - Oblast Haskovo, former name Haskovo okrug) is a province in southern Bulgaria, neighbouring Greece and Turkey to the southeast, comprising parts of the Thracian valley along the river Maritsa. It is named after its administrative and industrial centre - the city of Haskovo. The province embraces a territory of  that is divided into 11 municipalities with a total population, of 256,408 inhabitants.

Municipalities

The Haskovo province (Област, oblast) contains 11 municipalities (singular: община, obshtina - plural: Общини, obshtini). The following table shows the names of each municipality in English and Cyrillic, the main town or village (towns are shown in bold), and the population of each .

Demographics

The following table represents the change of the population in the province after World War II:

Ethnic groups

Total population (2011 census): 246,238
Ethnic groups (2011 census):
Identified themselves: 227,382 persons:
Bulgarians: 180,541 (79.40%)
Turks: 28,444 (12.50%)
Romani: 15,889 (6.99%)
Others and indefinable: 2,508 (1.10%)
A further 20,000 persons in Haskovo Province did not declare their ethnic group at the 2011 census.

Religion
Religious adherence in the province according to 2001 census:

See also
Provinces of Bulgaria
Municipalities of Bulgaria
List of cities and towns in Bulgaria
List of villages in Haskovo Province

References

External links
 hs.government.bg

 
Provinces of Bulgaria